Phragmataecia furia is a species of moth of the family Cossidae. It is found in Uzbekistan, Afghanistan and possibly Tajikistan.

References

Moths described in 1890
Phragmataecia